Meadowview (listed as Meadow View by the Census Bureau in 2010) is a census-designated place (CDP) in Washington County, Virginia, United States. The population was 861 at the 2020 census. down from 967 at the 2010 census. 

It is part of the Kingsport–Bristol (TN)–Bristol (VA) Metropolitan Statistical Area, which is a component of the Johnson City–Kingsport–Bristol, TN-VA Combined Statistical Area – commonly known as the "Tri-Cities" region.

Meadowview and nearby Emory were previously a single Census-designated place listed as Meadowview-Emory, Virginia. For the 2010 census onwards they are listed as two separate.

History
The quiet community of Meadowview was called Meadow View (two separate words) until the 1930s.  Native American trails passed near the later site of the town.  The first settler was James Glenn, who purchased land in 1783.  Different theories exist regarding the origin of community's name.  Some believe the name may come from an early name of Meadow Mountain, the name for nearby Whitetop Mountain on the 1749 Peter Jefferson Map.  Another explanation is that William Edmondson named his house Edmondson's Meadow and enjoyed looking at the numerous green meadows surrounding his house.  Until the railroad's arrival in 1856, the town was small and remote.  After the train arrived, stockyards and a transportation center were established in Meadowview to ship livestock, produce and goods to all over the eastern US.  The town remained busy and active until the 1950s.  The area is now mainly a residential community.

Gallery

Schools
Meadowview Elementary

Points of interest 

 The American Chestnut Foundation is developing blight-resistant trees of the American chestnut (Castanea dentata) at its experimental farms near Meadowview.
 Novelist Barbara Kingsolver and her husband, Steven Hopp, own the locally sourced farm-to-table restaurant Harvest Table in downtown Meadowview, the founding of which was inspired by their book Animal, Vegetable, Miracle.

Notable people 

 Barbara Kingsolver, writer and novelist.

References

Further reading
Wagner, Jennifer and Williams, Stan. "Meadowview," Published by the Historical Society of Washington County, Virginia, 1998.

External links
 Welcome to Meadowview, VA

Census-designated places in Virginia
Census-designated places in Washington County, Virginia
Kingsport–Bristol metropolitan area
U.S. Route 11